Sondad railway station serves Soundad and surrounding villages in Bhandara district & Gondia district of Maharashtra, India.

References 

Gondia district
Railway stations in Gondia district
Nagpur SEC railway division